FinalRune Productions is an independent audio drama production company based in Alfred, Maine.  Their award-winning productions were featured in the Wall Street Journal on February 25, 2010.

Production Style

FinalRune Productions uses field recording techniques for recording radio drama, a technique taught to director Fred Greenhalgh by his mentor, Roger Gregg (of Crazy Dog Audio Theatre).

On location recording is more like film recording than traditional, studio-based radio drama.  Actors, director, and sound recordist go to an acoustical environment similar to that referenced in the play, and record in stereo to a compact flash recording device.

The result is a drama that has natural sound that is laborious and difficult to re-create in post-production.  This process also greatly speeds up post-production.

Company history

FinalRune Productions began in 2006 with the production of the story Day of the Dead, by Fred Greenhalgh.  Since then, FinalRune has released over a dozen other titles, mostly original work.

In 2010, FinalRune released the pilot of an audio serialization of the novel Open Season by Archer Mayor .  This pilot was produced on location and is an example of how dramatized treatments of novels different from a single-voiced audiobook.

Awards

 2008 - Gold Ogle Award, "Waiting for a Window"

Press

 February 15, 2010 - "Return With Us to the Thrilling Days Of Yesteryear - Via the Internet." - Wall Street Journal  - https://www.wsj.com/articles/SB10001424052748704240004575085313479028540 
 March 10, 2010 - "Making radio waves: Alfred man gets exposure for his audio dramas" - Current Publishing https://web.archive.org/web/20100315123322/http://www.keepmecurrent.com/arts_and_entertainment/article_5e81e428-2c6a-11df-b424-001cc4c002e0.html
 April 24, 2007 - "The podcast's the thing to revive radio drama,” The Guardian, UK - https://www.theguardian.com/stage/theatreblog/2007/apr/24/thepodcaststhethingtorevi
 July 26, 2009 - "Drama producer at WMPG wins national radio award" - Portland Press Herald

References

Audiobook companies and organizations
Radio production companies
Companies based in York County, Maine
Alfred, Maine